Lee So-jung (born September 3, 1993), better known by the mononym Sojung, is a South Korean singer. She is best known as a member of the South Korean girl group Ladies' Code. Sojung made her debut as a soloist in March 2017 with single "Better Than Me".

Early life 
Lee was born on September 3, 1993, in Wonju, Gangwon Province, South Korea. She attended Dankook University, where she majored in modern music.

Career

2012–2014: Debut with Ladies' Code and car crash 

In 2012, Lee auditioned for the talent show The Voice of Korea, which had its first episode aired on February 10 of the same year. For the show, she released several songs including "2 Different Tears", a cover version of Wonder Girls song, "Memory Loss (기억 상실)" and "No More". During the show's final episode, aired on March 30, Lee was announced as one of the winners.

In February 2013, it was announced that Lee would be a member of Ladies' Code, under Polaris Entertainment. The group's debut mini-album Code 01 Bad Girl along with the title song "Bad Girl" and accompanying music video was released on March 7, 2013. In the same year, she collaborated with rapper San E on the song "Twisted (불편한 관계)", released on November.

On Sojung's 21st birthday, September 3, 2014, she and the rest of the group were involved in a car accident. Ladies' Code was returning to Seoul from their performance at Open Concert. Lee's groupmate EunB was pronounced dead minutes later. Lee and Rise, another groupmate, suffered serious injuries and were taken to the Catholic University of Korea St. Vincent's Hospital in Suwon. Lee's situation was stabilized, but Rise's condition deteriorated and she was transferred to Ajou University Hospital, where she died four days later on September 7, 2014. Lee was transferred to a hospital in her hometown. The remaining three members returned to the group's dormitory on November 12 with Lee still receiving outpatient treatment.

2015–present: Debut as a soloist 
After Ladies' Code's return after the accident, Lee was featured in two episodes of the King of Mask Singer talent show on February 21. For the show, she released the songs "Blue In You (그대 안의 블루)", a collaboration with Lee Tae-sung, and "If You Come Back (그대 돌아 오면)", garnering a total of 59 votes. In June, she released the song "I Don't Want (바라지 않아)", a duet with Jung Key. Still in 2016, Lee became a contender on the Girl Spirit competition show, which had its first episode aired on July 19 on JTBC.

Lee made her official debut as a soloist in May 2017 with the ballad track "Better Than Me". The music video was released on May 4, starring Loona's Hyunjin. The following month, she collaborated with Mind U for the release of the single "A Break Up Song", included on the studio album, RE: Mine. She then released "Deep Inside (딥 인사이드)", a collaboration with Jung Han-hae, in January 2018. On March 14, 2018, Lee returned with the release of her first single album, Stay Here, consisting of a title track of the same name and b-side track "Crystal Clear".

In February 2020, Lee and Ladies' Code bandmates Zuny and Ashley left Polaris Entertainment after contract expiration and unsuccessful renegotiations with the company. Lee's subsequent work included the release of her second single album Island and its lead single of the same name on August 22, 2020. The song is heavily influenced by the tropical house genre, an atypical venture for Lee. The following year, she participated in JTBC's second-chance vocal competition show, Sing Again, finishing among the program's top six contestants. On February 19, 2021, under new label Needs Music Entertainment (니즈뮤직엔터테인먼트), Lee released her third single album, 함께 했는데 이별은 나 혼자인 거야, consisting of a title ballad of the same name and its instrumental version. The track became the first of Lee's singles to enter Korea's weekly Gaon Digital Chart, peaking at number 92. The following weeks the song achieved new highs peaking at number 65, number 42 and number 33. Additionally, the song peaked at number 30 on the Gaon Download Chart.

In April 2021, Lee signed a contract with JTBC Studios.

Personal life

Health
Throughout her career, Lee has suffered problems with anorexia.

Discography

Single album

Singles

Soundtrack appearances

Other appearances

Filmography

Television shows

Theater

Awards and nominations

References

External links 

1993 births
Living people
People from Wonju
21st-century South Korean singers
21st-century South Korean women singers
South Korean dance musicians
South Korean women pop singers
South Korean female idols
The Voice of Korea contestants
Dankook University alumni